The Wyoming Army National Guard Cavalry Stable in Newcastle, Wyoming was built between 1933 and 1936 for the Wyoming National Guard's horses. It is the last National Guard cavalry stable in Wyoming.  It has been used as the Anna Miller Museum by the Weston County Historical Society since 1966.

Anna Miller Museum
The Anna Miller Museums is a museum of local history, with exhibits about the area's pioneers, Native Americans and prehistoric history.

Stable history
Funding for the stables was provided by the Depression-era Civil Works Administration and Works Progress Administration. The Newcastle National Guard unit was formed in 1899 as Company A, Second Regiment, Wyoming National Guard, becoming Company A of the Third Wyoming Infantry Regiment in 1905. In 1921 the Third Infantry Regiment was reorganized as the First Cavalry, finally becoming in 1942 Troop F, 115th Horse Mechanized Cavalry. Similar units with similar facilities existed in Sheridan, Douglas, Casper and Torrington.

Footings were started, but due to the onset of World War II the hall was never completed. Stone intended for the hall was appropriated for other local construction projects. Of the Wyoming units, only Torrington had a completed riding hall.

Stonework was by the Sundstrom Brothers, who also worked on the Weston County Courthouse.

The building was built with stables and a caretaker's residence within. Much of the interior has an open ceiling with the roof structure visible above. The roof structure is heavy timber trusses on  centers.

The Wyoming Army National Guard Cavalry Stable was placed on the National Register of Historic Places in 1994.

References

External links
 at the National Park Service's NRHP database
Wyoming Army National Guard Cavalry Stable at the Wyoming State Historic Preservation Office

 Anna Miller Museum - Newcastle Area Chamber of Commerce site
 Anna Miller Museum - information from Planetware
 Museum information from Online Highway

Military facilities on the National Register of Historic Places in Wyoming
Buildings and structures in Weston County, Wyoming
History museums in Wyoming
Museums in Weston County, Wyoming
Works Progress Administration in Wyoming
National Register of Historic Places in Weston County, Wyoming
Stables in the United States
Newcastle, Wyoming